In the Time of Gods is the eighth studio album by Dar Williams. It was released April 17, 2012 on Razor & Tie, the label that has released almost all of her albums.

Track listing
All songs written by Dar Williams, except where noted.
"I Am the One Who Will Remember Everything" – 3:33
"This Earth" – 3:13
"I Have Been Around the World" (Williams, Rob Hyman) – 3:17
"The Light and the Sea" (Williams, Hyman) – 3:42
"You Will Ride with Me Tonight" – 2:41
"Crystal Creek" – 3:56
"Summer Child" (Williams, Hyman) – 3:05
"I Will Free Myself" (Williams, Hyman) – 3:15
"Write This Number Down" – 3:00
"Storm King" – 3:16

The album is about Greek mythology.

References

2012 albums
Dar Williams albums
Razor & Tie albums
Concept albums
Ancient Greece in art and culture